The Pinellas County Center for the Arts (PCCA) is a center in the visual and performing arts in the U.S. state of Florida. PCCA is located in Jonathan C Gibbs High School, and populates buildings 4, 5, and 8.

History
In 1979, John Blank, an administrator in the Pinellas County Schools, felt a need for an emphasis in the arts within the school system. A preliminary survey of the County's students, facilities, and communities was taken and Mr. Stan Lee Boss was sent to Dallas, Texas for an on-site visit of their visual and performing arts schools.

With the approval of the school board, a full-time director was provided to work with three Gibbs High School arts instructors, three supervisors and an administrator to prepare a model project for the artistically talented students for the State of Florida.  After some thirty on-site visits to well-established secondary schools and programs, a model was written for the State of Florida, published and distributed to all sixty-seven county school superintendents and known arts supervisors.

Dr. Scott Rose, with the approval of the School Board, chose as one of his five-year objectives the development and implementation of both the Artistically Talented Program (now known as PCCA) at Gibbs High School and a Program for the Academically Talented (now known as the International Baccalaureate Program at St. Petersburg High School).

This school of the arts officially began in late August 1984.  There were approximately 200 9th and 10th graders starting school; it was hoped that eventually the student population would reach 400.  As of today, the number of students attending PCCA is about 500, fairly equally divided among the four major disciplines, Dance, Theatre, Music, and Visual Art.

The Program
The PCCA curriculum is centered on individualized instruction and concentrating on the student's selected artistic major.  Through blocking courses with two to three hour segments of time, the student has the opportunity to develop a work in depth while the teacher is afforded time to work individually with the students as well as provide guest artists and field trips without impinging on the student's daily four academic classes.

Artistic Disciplines
Dance is divided into Modern Dance and Ballet. Music has Vocal, Instrumental, and Piano. The Theatre program is segmented into Performance Theatre, Technical Theatre, Literary Theatre, and Musical Theatre. Visual Arts, the most populated discipline, has many phases including painting, sculpture, photography, printmaking, and ceramics. All instructors are practicing artists who also serve as mentors to their students. Students receive one-on-one training with private teachers to hone their skills. Local, regional, and nationally acclaimed professional artists conduct master classes as well as perform at the school. A high percentage of students earn scholarship money to further their education.

Admissions
Admittance to PCCA is through application, audition, and acceptance.  Auditions are held in the middle part of each school year so that the accepted student has time to be properly scheduled for 9th grade.

Prominent alumni
Visual Art
 
Theater
Juli Crockett- Playwright and director, former professional boxer
Sierra Kay- Lead singer of Versa
Michael Lynche- Fourth place on American Idol (season 9)
Katie Rees- Former Miss Nevada
Scott Sanders- TV, film and stage producer
Alexandra Jennings- Actress, known for The Goldbergs
Blaine Krauss- Actor
Michelle Dowdy- Jazz singer and actress

Dance
Rebecca Minkoff- fashion designer
Calvin Royal III- ballet dancer
Ephraim Sykes- Actor, dancer, musician, and Tony Award nominee
Daniel Ulbricht- Dancer with New York City Ballet

Music
Dylan Glatthorn - Composer
Daniel Thrasher - YouTuber
 Men's Bathroom Choir - YouTube based musical ensemble

External links
 Pinellas County Center for the Arts

References

Educational institutions established in 1984
Magnet schools in Florida
High schools in Pinellas County, Florida
Public high schools in Florida
1984 establishments in Florida